The Liberal Socialist Party (abbreviation: LSP) was a political party in the Singapore. It was formed in the 1950s from the merger of the Singapore Progressive Party (SPP) and the Democratic Party (DP), the latter not to be confused with the Singapore Democratic Party (SDP).  The merger occurred in order to consolidate their relatively compatible and similar aims, that of gradual and nonradical progressivism implementing liberal policies.

The merger occurred because of the weak performance of both parties in the Singapore general election of 1955, but members started to merge with the Singapore People's Alliance (SPA) before the following general election of 1959. The LSP contested the general election of 1959 against the SPA, had a significant showing, gaining more than 8% of the popular vote and contesting 32 seats, but failed to win any of them. Following the election most of the LSP merged with the SPA and the rump of the LSP died out as the now ruling People's Action Party (PAP) gained dominance. The SPA faded away during the incidents of merger, ensuing heated PAP-UMNO relations, and a shifted political focus towards an additional struggle between the PAP and the Barisan Sosialis.  The LSP ceased to exist by 1965, when Singapore became fully independent, and never stood candidates for election.

Election Results

Legislative Assembly

 Legislative Assembly By-Election

References

1956 establishments in Singapore
1963 disestablishments in Singapore
Defunct socialist parties in Singapore
Liberal parties in Singapore
Political parties established in 1956
Political parties disestablished in 1963